Matt Maeson (born January 17, 1993) is an American singer-songwriter and musician from Virginia Beach, Virginia, signed to Neon Gold Records and Atlantic Records.

Early life
Maeson was raised in Norfolk, Virginia. His parents were juvenile delinquents who later became "musicianaries", eventually playing in Christian metal bands. He was banned from listening to secular rock music on the radio until he was a teenager. Maeson started playing the guitar when he was 15. He performed at biker rallies and prisons with his parents' ministry. Maeson's uncle, who was a part of the same ministry, was murdered. Maeson's forearm tattoos "Born a sinner" and "Die a martyr" are inspired by his uncle's legacy.

Personal Life
Maeson became engaged in 2020. He and his wife have one child, a son named Joa, who was born in 2021.

Career

In November 2016, Maeson released his debut single "Cringe". In 2018, Maeson performed at festivals such as Bonnaroo, Lollapalooza, and Forecastle. Prior to the release of his debut album Bank on the Funeral on April 5, 2019, he released two EPs, Who Killed Matt Maeson in 2017, and The Hearse in 2018. In January 2019, his song "Cringe" reached No. 7 on the Adult Alternative Songs chart. The song later spent four weeks at No. 1 on the Billboard Alternative Songs chart in August that year, the longest running number-one single by a new artist in 2019. "Cringe" was certified gold by the RIAA on February 11, 2020. In August 2020, Maeson returned to number one on the Billboard Alternative Songs chart with "Hallucinogenics", which went on to top the Billboard Rock Airplay chart one week later. Maeson was featured in Illenium’s 2021 single “Heavenly Side” from their fourth full length studio album 'Fallen Embers'. Full studio album Never Had to Leave was released on August 26, 2022.

Discography

Albums

Extended plays

Singles

References

1993 births
American Christians
Living people
Singer-songwriters from Virginia
American male singer-songwriters
Atlantic Records artists
Contemporary folk musicians